"Invitation" is a song by Bronisław Kaper with lyrics by Paul Francis Webster, originally used in the film A Life of Her Own (1950). Though it was nominated for a Golden Globe award for Best Score in the original film, it only became a jazz standard after being used as the theme in the 1952 film Invitation. Tony Thomas  notes that it was selected for the film for its degree of poignance. It is considered to be Kaper's second best known song after "On Green Dolphin Street".  Jazzstandards.com describes it as a "lush and haunting score", and notes that it is most associated with John Coltrane, who recorded it in 1958.
Howard Morgen, who arranged it for guitar, writes that the "haunting" tune has "long been recognized by jazz players for its potential as an interesting mood piece" and "still sounds fresh and contemporary today".

George Shearing was responsible for arranging the song for piano, while Frank Mantooth arranged a Latin version of it. Dakota Staton covered it on her 1958 album Dynamic!.  In 1963 the song was recorded by Rosemary Clooney, to a lush arrangement by Nelson Riddle, and featured as the first track on her album "Love". It has since been recorded by the vocalists Carmen McRae,  Freddy Cole, Andy Bey and Patricia Barber, pianists Bill Evans, Randy Halberstadt, Steve Kuhn and Rene Rosnes, saxophonists John Coltrane, Joe Henderson, Herb Geller, Vincent Herring, Sahib Shihab and Don Braden, trumpeters Roy Hargrove and Brian Lynch, bassist Ray Drummond and Cal Tjader (on his album 'Latin Kick') among others. David Frackenpohl arranged a version for guitar, which was published in the 2004 Mel Bay book Jazz Guitar Standards: Chord Melody Solos.

Some significant recordings
Les Brown - vocal by Jo Ann Greer.  78 rpm single for Coral Records 61047, backed with Sitting in the Sun, recorded in Hollywood (1953)
George Wallington - George Wallington with Strings (1953)
John Young - Young John Young (1956)
Cal Tjader Sextet - Latin Kick (1956)
Dakota Staton - Dynamic! (1958)
John Coltrane - Standard Coltrane (recorded 1958, released 1962)
Buddy Collette - At the Cinema! (1959)
Chris Connor - 45 rpm single for Atlantic Records Atl 2073 (1959)
Caterina Valente - Super-Fonics (1961)
Johnny "Hammond" Smith - Stimulation (1961)
Art Blakey and The Jazz Messengers – !!!!! Impulse! Art Blakey! Jazz Messengers! !!!!! (recorded 1961, released 1970)
Dinah Washington - I Wanna Be Loved (1962)
Junior Mance - The Soul of Hollywood (1962)
Quincy Jones - The Quintessence (1962)
Sarah Vaughan - You're Mine You (1962) (arranged by Quincy Jones)
Ray Bryant - Hollywood Jazz Beat (1962)
Milt Jackson - Invitation (1962)
Kenny Burrell - Lotsa Bossa Nova! (Kapp Records KL1326 (1963)
Roy Haynes - People (Pacific Jazz PJ(S)82) (1964)
Lucky Thompson - Lucky Strikes (1964)
The Three Sounds - Three Moods (1964)
Dorothy Ashby - The Fantastic Jazz Harp of Dorothy Ashby (1965)
Sahib Shihab - Companionship (recorded 1965, released 1971)
Ahmad Jamal - Rhapsody (1965)
Kai Winding - More Brass (1966)
Joe Henderson - If You're Not Part of the Solution, You're Part of the Problem (recorded 1970, released 2004 as part of reissue At the Lighthouse)
Archie Shepp - Doodlin' (recorded 1970, released 1978)
Stan Getz - Dynasty (1971)
Tony Bennett - The Good Things in Life (1972)
Jimmy Heath - The Gap Sealer (1972)
Vince Wallace — Live! At The Studio Cafe (1972)
Charles McPherson - Today's Man (1973)
The Singers Unlimited - Invitation (MPS Records 68.107) (1973) 
Al Haig - Invitation (1974)
Andrew Hill - Invitation (1974)
Bill Evans with Eddie Gomez - Intuition (1974)
Walter Bishop Jr. - Valley Land (1974)
Lee Konitz  - Oleo (1974)
Jaco Pastorius - Invitation (1983)
Phil Woods - An Affair To Remember (1994)
Moe Koffman - Devil's Brew (1996)
Buddy DeFranco with Dave McKenna- You Must Believe In Swing (Concord Jazz – CCD-4756-2) (1997)
 The Four Freshmen - Golden Anniversary Celebration (EMI-Capitol, 1998)"
Takao Uematsu - Straight Ahead (DEEP JAZZ REALITY/OCTAVE-LAB,1977)
Dexter Gordon - Something Different (1987 SteepleChase Productions)
Boz Scaggs  Swing Low, 2008 https://www.beautifulboz.com/page/107978

References

1952 songs
Songs with music by Bronisław Kaper
Songs with lyrics by Paul Francis Webster
1950s jazz standards
John Coltrane
Tony Bennett songs
Dinah Washington songs
Caterina Valente songs